The Oneonta Red Sox were a minor league baseball team based in Oneonta, New York.

The first incarnation of the team played in the first New York–Pennsylvania League in 1924. On August of that year, the Utica Utes relocated to Oneonta to finish their season as the Oneonta Indians. In Oneonta, the club posted an 18–22 record. However prior to the next season, the club relocated to Shamokin, Pennsylvania, to become the Shamokin Shammies.

The second incarnation of the team can be traced back to 1940 when the Can-Am League's Cornwall Maple Leafs relocated to Oneonta and played their home games at Damaschke Field. The club played until 1942 as the Oneonta Indians, winning league titles in 1941 and 1942.  However the league suspended operation until 1946, due to World War II. However the team did reemerge that season as the Red Sox. Throughout its entire history the second incarnation of the club was affiliated with the Boston Red Sox.

Frank Malzone played third base for one season in Oneonta in 1949 before moving up the minor league system. The club then won two more titles, in 1948 and in the league's final season of 1951.

In 1966 a new Oneonta Red Sox team was established and played in the Class A New York–Penn League.

Year-by-year record

References

Defunct minor league baseball teams
Baseball teams established in 1924
Baseball teams disestablished in 1951
Boston Red Sox minor league affiliates
1924 establishments in New York (state)
1951 disestablishments in New York (state)
Otsego County, New York
Defunct baseball teams in New York (state)